Chionodes caucasiella is a moth in the family Gelechiidae. It is found in Russia.

References

Chionodes
Moths described in 1995
Moths of Asia